Kerry Michael Dixon (born 24 July 1961) is an English retired professional footballer who played as a forward.

His club career was spent most notably at Chelsea, where he won the Second Division twice. His 193 goals for the club across all competitions made him their third-highest goalscorer of all time. 

For three seasons in a row, 1982–83, 1983–84 and 1984–85, he was the top goalscorer in his teams' divisions, 3 (with Reading), 2 and 1 (with Chelsea) respectively. 

Dixon scored four goals in eight international appearances for the England national football team, and represented the nation at the 1986 FIFA World Cup.

Playing career

Early years
Dixon was born in Luton. A tall and athletic striker who had pace, an impressive heading ability and was effective with both feet, he started out as an apprentice with Tottenham Hotspur but was released by the club.

Reading
After spells with Chesham United and Dunstable, he got his first taste of League football with Reading, who signed him for £20,000 in 1980. He scored 51 league goals in 116 appearances for the then Third Division club, including four in a 7–5 defeat at Doncaster Rovers in September 1982.

Chelsea
After his Reading days, Dixon signed with Chelsea in August 1983 by manager John Neal. Chelsea chairman Ken Bates initially hesitated when faced with the £150,000 transfer fee plus an additional £25,000 if Dixon ever played for the England national side, but relented and the deal went ahead. Dixon arrived as part of Neal's radical re-building of the side, who had narrowly avoided relegation to the Third Division three months earlier, and was joined in the same summer by Pat Nevin, Nigel Spackman, Joe McLaughlin and Eddie Niedzwiecki.

Dixon's impact at Chelsea was immediate; he scored two goals on his debut against Derby County and added 32 more through the season as the club romped to promotion as Second Division champions to reach the First Division after five years away. Chelsea clinched promotion with a 5–0 win against Leeds United, in which Dixon scored a hat-trick. He struck up an impressive partnership with fiery Scot and fellow striker David Speedie, despite initial personal problems between the two, and also linked up well with winger Nevin; between them the trio scored almost 200 goals over the next three years. His impact on the First Division the following season was equally impressive, scoring with a memorable volley in the opening match against Arsenal at Highbury in a 1–1 draw. Dixon eventually finished up as joint top scorer (alongside Gary Lineker) with 24 league goals while Chelsea finished sixth in the final table. In the same season, he hit a further eight goals in the League Cup as Chelsea reached the semi-finals, where they surprisingly lost to Sunderland. In his first two seasons at Chelsea he scored a total of 70 goals in just 101 games.

Chelsea challenged for the title in the 1985–86 season but Dixon suffered torn stomach muscles during an FA Cup tie against Liverpool in January, which did much to damage their chances. They eventually finished sixth again, though he did score twice in a 2–1 win over Manchester United at Old Trafford. The injury also took away much of Dixon's pace and he was never quite the same player again.

During 1986, Dixon was frequently linked with a transfer to Manchester United, whose manager Ron Atkinson had long been monitoring its form, but Atkinson was sacked in November of that year and new manager Alex Ferguson did not follow up interest in Dixon, who would ultimately remain at Stamford Bridge for nearly six more years.

Chelsea struggled in the following two seasons after a series of clashes between key players and the management saw the successful mid 1980s side gradually broken up. Dixon himself was dropped from the side after losing form and was close to joining Chelsea's London rivals Arsenal, though the deal eventually collapsed after Bates' intervention. Chelsea were relegated in 1988, an event which, ironically, rejuvenated his career with the club. He scored 25 league goals as Chelsea returned to the First Division as champions at the first attempt in 1988–89. A year later he scored a further 26, including a final day hat-trick against Millwall, to help Chelsea finish 5th, their highest league position since 1970. He spent two more seasons with the club and continued to score on a regular basis, although Chelsea failed to finish higher than mid table in 1991 or 1992. Dixon's final serious chance of a major trophy with Chelsea came in the 1990–91 season, when they went on a good run in the League Cup but lost to Sheffield Wednesday in the semi-finals.

With 193 goals in total to his name, Dixon is Chelsea's third highest goal scorer of all time, behind only Bobby Tambling and Frank Lampard. He is also tenth in the club's all-time appearances list. His only honours with the club, however, were the two Second Division championship medals and the Full Members Cup.

Southampton
Dixon left Chelsea in 1992 and joined Southampton in a £575,000 deal, where he briefly linked up with Speedie again, though not with the same success. During his time at Southampton he only managed nine league appearances and two goals.

Luton Town
He left Southampton in February 1993 to join Luton Town on loan, with the move, a free transfer, being made permanent in October. The highlight of his time at Luton was reaching the FA Cup semi-finals in 1994, where he faced his old side Chelsea and lost 2–0. He scored 20 goals in 88 appearances for Luton.

Millwall and Watford
In March 1995, Dixon joined Millwall in a £5,000 transfer deal. After 31 appearances and nine goals, he was sold to Watford for £25,000 in January 1996. Dixon appeared in 11 matches for Watford.

Doncaster Rovers
The final league club he played for was Doncaster Rovers during the 1996–97 season. He appeared in 16 matches for the Rovers, scoring three times.

Basildon United
For a short period of the 1997–98 season Dixon played for Basildon United in the Essex Senior League but he picked up a hamstring injury stretching to score a goal against Great Wakering Rovers in what turned out to be his last game for the club.

International career
His scoring feats earned him an England call-up; he made his debut against Mexico in 1985 during a friendly international tournament in Mexico City. Three days later Dixon scored twice and set up Bryan Robson for the other in England's 3–0 win over West Germany. He scored two more four days later against the USA in Los Angeles.

1986 World Cup
After his injury in 1985, he was nevertheless selected for the England squad for the 1986 FIFA World Cup but the presence of Lineker and Peter Beardsley in the side limited him to a six-minute substitute appearance against Poland. He played only one more game for England after that, and finished his international career with eight caps and four goals.

Managerial career

Doncaster Rovers
After his playing days were over, he became Doncaster's player-manager, but was sacked in August 1997.

Boreham Wood, Letchworth and Hitchin Town
Since then, Dixon has had stints coaching non-League sides Boreham Wood, Letchworth, and Hitchin Town.

Personal life
Dixon does occasional work for Chelsea TV. He commentated on Chelsea matches with Gary Taphouse from 2002 to 2008 on both the club's own digital radio station, then on Smooth FM. He is also involved with matchday hospitality at the club. He was also joint manager at Dunstable alongside Paul Reeves and involved in community work in the area.

In June 2014, he was charged with a class-A drugs offence. The charge was subsequently dropped.

In June 2015, Dixon was found guilty of assault of a man in a pub in Dunstable. On 19 June 2015, Dixon was jailed for nine months for the offence.

In October 2016, in an interview with the BBC he spoke of his long term addiction to gambling.

His father Mike was also a footballer.

Career statistics

Notes

References

External links

Profile at England Football Online

Bibliography 

1961 births
Living people
English footballers
English football managers
England international footballers
England under-21 international footballers
Footballers from Luton
Association football forwards
Chesham United F.C. players
Dunstable Town F.C. players
Reading F.C. players
Chelsea F.C. players
Southampton F.C. players
Luton Town F.C. players
Millwall F.C. players
Watford F.C. players
Doncaster Rovers F.C. players
Basildon United F.C. players
Doncaster Rovers F.C. managers
Hitchin Town F.C. managers
Dunstable Town F.C. managers
Premier League players
English Football League players
Essex Senior Football League players
1986 FIFA World Cup players
First Division/Premier League top scorers
English people convicted of assault
Prisoners and detainees of England and Wales
English Football League managers